Koumaritsi is a village on Mount Oeta in Phthiotis, Greece. Since the 2011 local government reform it is part of the municipality of Lamia, and of the municipal unit of Gorgopotamos. Population was 43 in the 2011 census.

References

Populated places in Phthiotis
Mount Oeta